The men's pole vault event at the 2000 Summer Olympics as part of the athletics program was held at the Olympic Stadium on Wednesday, 27 September and Friday, 29 September. Thirty-six athletes from 22 nations competed. The maximum number of athletes per nation had been set at 3 since the 1930 Olympic Congress. The event was won by Nick Hysong of the United States, the nation's first victory in the event since its 16-Games streak (from 1896 to 1968) ended. The American team also took silver, as Lawrence Johnson finished second. Maksim Tarasov became the seventh man to win multiple pole vault medals, and the second to do so under two different flags, adding a bronze to his 1992 gold (for the Unified Team).

Summary

Sergey Bubka had been the dominant world record holder for five Olympic cycles and this was his fourth Olympic appearance, but the Bubka curse continued into a third consecutive Olympics as he failed to clear a height for the second time (it also happened at Barcelona '92). Australia's two Soviet born vaulters Viktor Chistiakov and Dmitriy Markov were perfect before their adopted home crowd to that point, along with American Lawrence Johnson. With an earlier miss at 5.50m, Nick Hysong was in fourth place, but his first attempt clearance leapfrogged him into the lead, when the rest of the field failed to match him. Johnson was the only one to make it on his second attempt, putting him in silver position. 1992 champion Maksim Tarasov entered the height tied for fifth with Okkert Brits with three earlier misses, while Michael Stolle had already taken seven attempts to get over his first three bars. Both Tarasov and Stolle made 5.90m on their last attempt, but Tarasov had the tiebreaker to take the bronze. Markov saved one heroic attempt to snatch victory, but nobody could clear 5.96m.

Background

This was the 24th appearance of the event, which is one of 12 athletics events to have been held at every Summer Olympics. The returning finalists from the 1996 Games were gold medalist Jean Galfione of France, fourth-place finisher Igor Potapovich of Kazakhstan, sixth-place finisher Dmitriy Markov of Belarus (now representing Australia), seventh-place finisher Tim Lobinger of Germany, eighth-place finisher Lawrence Johnson of the United States, ninth-place finisher Michael Stolle of Germany, and eleventh-place finisher (and 1992 finalist) Danny Krasnov of Israel. 1992 gold medalist Maksim Tarasov (then of the Unified Team, now of Russia) also returned, and was the reigning world champion—the first man other than Sergey Bubka to win that title. Bubka, of Ukraine, was the favorite (especially in the absence of 2004 leader Jeff Hartwig, who had failed to make the United States team); Bubka had been the best pole vaulter in the world since the early 1980s but had managed only one Olympic medal, gold in 1988 (missing 1984 due to boycott, 1992 due to injury, and failing to clear a height in the 1996 final).

The Czech Republic made its men's pole vaulting debut. The United States made its 23rd appearance, most of any nation, having missed only the boycotted 1980 Games.

Qualification

Each National Olympic Committee was permitted to enter up to three athletes that had jumped 5.60 metres or higher during the qualification period. The maximum number of athletes per nation had been set at 3 since the 1930 Olympic Congress. If an NOC had no athletes that qualified under that standard, one athlete that had jumped 5.45 metres or higher could be entered.

Competition format

The competition used the two-round format introduced in 1912, with results cleared between rounds. Vaulters received three attempts at each height. Ties were broken by the countback rule.

In the qualifying round, the bar was set at 5.25 metres, 5.40 metres, 5.55 metres, 5.65 metres, and 5.70 metres. The next step would have been 5.75 metres, but no vaulters attempted that height. All vaulters clearing 5.75 metres advanced to the final. If fewer than 12 cleared that height, the top 12 (including ties, after applying the countback rules) advanced.

In the final, the bar was set at 5.50 metres, 5.70 metres, 5.80 metres, 5.90 metres, and 5.96 metres.

Records

These were the standing world and Olympic records (in meters) prior to the 2000 Summer Olympics.

No new world or Olympic records were set during the competition.

Schedule

All times are Australian Eastern Standard Time (UTC+10)

Results

Qualifying 

The qualifying round was held on Wednesday, 27 September 2000. The qualifying height was 5.75 metres. For all qualifiers who did not achieve the standard, the remaining spaces in the final were filled by the highest jumps until a total of 12 qualifiers. Because only six men cleared 5.70 metres, raising the bar to 5.75 metres was unnecessary.

Final

The final was held on Friday 29 September 2000.

References

External links
Official Report of the 2000 Sydney Summer Olympics

Athletics at the 2000 Summer Olympics
Pole vault at the Olympics
Men's events at the 2000 Summer Olympics